Parapercis xanthogramma is a fish species in the sandperch family, Pinguipedidae. 
It is found in the Central Pacific including Fiji, Western Samoa and Tonga. 

References

Pinguipedidae
Taxa named by Hisashi Imamura
Taxa named by Tetsuo Yoshino
Fish described in 2007